Oren Sagron (born 12 July 1972) is an Israeli former professional footballer that has played in Hapoel Be'er Sheva.

He is of a Tunisian-Jewish descent.

Honours

Club
 Hapoel Beer Sheva

 Premier League:
 Third place (3): 1993/1994, 1994/1995, 1996/1997
 State Cup:
 Winners (1): 1996/1997
 Runners-up (1): 2002/2003
 Toto Cup:
 Winners (1): 1995/1996

References

External links
 

1972 births
Living people
Hapoel Be'er Sheva F.C. players
Beitar Be'er Sheva F.C. players
Maccabi Be'er Sheva F.C. players
Liga Leumit players
Israeli Premier League players
Footballers from Beersheba
Israeli people of Tunisian-Jewish descent
Association football forwards
Association football midfielders
Israeli footballers
Israel under-21 international footballers